Trevor George Blades (born 22 June 1947) is a former English cricketer. Blades was a right-handed batsman who fielded as a wicket-keeper. He was born in Peterborough, Cambridgeshire.

Blades made his debut for Lincolnshire in the 1969 Minor Counties Championship against Staffordshire. Blades played Minor counties cricket for Lincolnshire from 1969 to 1977, which included 26 Minor Counties Championship matches. He made his List A debut against Glamorgan in the 1st round of the 1974 Gillette Cup. He took a single catch and made a single stumping in the Glamorgans innings, while in the Lincolnshire innings he scored 50 not out to help guide Lincolnshire to a famous 6 wicket victory against their first-class opponents. He played a further List A match for Lincolnshire against Surrey in the following round. In this match, he took a single catch, while with the bat he scored 2 runs before being dismissed by Geoff Arnold, with Surrey winning by 123 runs.

References

External links
Trevor Blades at ESPNcricinfo
Trevor Blades at CricketArchive

1947 births
Living people
Sportspeople from Peterborough
English cricketers
Lincolnshire cricketers
Wicket-keepers